Manohar J. Pherwani was an Indian corporate executive and banker who served as Chairman of the Unit Trust of India (UTI), National Housing Bank (NHB) and Infrastructure Leasing & Financial Services (IL&FS). Under his tenure of almost a decade as the chairman of UTI, the asset base of UTI grew from ₹1 billion to about ₹176.5 billion.

In 1987, he set up IL&FS to finance infrastructure projects in the country. He headed the 1991 "Expert Study Group" into the establishment of a new stock exchange (also known as the MJ Pherwani Committee) which resulted in the formation of the National Stock Exchange of India (NSE).

Controversies

In 1992, while serving as Chairman & Managing Director of the National Housing Bank, the bank's exposure of over 1,000 crore worth of re-purchase option (repo) based security trades to fraudster Harshad Mehta came to light. Pherwani had been regarded as Mehta's mentor. Consequently, Pherwani stepped down from NHB. He also quit as chairman of the NSE and IL&FS in the wake of the 1992 securities scam.

Death
On 21 May 1992, less than 12 days after resigning as NHB chairperson Pherwani was found dead by his family members at his Bombay home. The cause of death was found to be cardiac arrest.

In popular culture

Actor K. K. Raina portrayed Pherwani in the Sony LIV hit series Scam 1992.

References

Further reading
 The Scam: Who Won, Who Lost, Who Got away?, Sucheta Dalal and Debashis Basu, Paperback, 314 pages, UBS Publishers Distributors, 1994, 
 Polyester Prince-The Real Story of Dhirubhai Ambani, Hamish McDonald, Paperback, 296 pages, Allen & Unwin Pty., Limited (Australia), September 1999, 

Indian chairpersons of corporations
1992 deaths
Year of birth missing